Sindhu Menon is a former Indian actress, who has starred in Kannada, Telugu,  Malayalam and Tamil films.

Early life
Sindhu Menon was born in Bangalore, Karnataka, India into a Malayali family. She has an elder brother, Karthik, who worked as a Kannada music channel VJ and turned actor, recently. And also two elder sisters. Sindhu Menon is able to communicate fluently in several languages, including Malayalam, her mother tongue, Telugu, Tamil, Kannada, Hindi and English. She was also brought up in her birthplace, Bangalore.

Career
Sindhu Menon, a trained Bharatanatyam dancer from her childhood, got her entry into the film industry when Bhasker Hegde, one of the judges of a Bharatanatyam competition in which Menon participated and emerged as the first place winner, introduced her to Kannada film director K. V. Jayaram, who cast her in his film Rashmi in 1994. Subsequently, she got several offers to act and became a full-time actress, by enacting the female lead role character in the 1999 film Prema Prema Prema, when she was merely 13 years old.

Later, at the age of 15, she entered the Telugu, Malayalam and Tamil film industries as well, by acting in the films Bhadrachalam, Uthaman and Samuthiram, respectively. She went on to act alongside Kannada Star Sudeep in Nandi (2002), Bharathiraja's Kadal Pookkal (2002), Trinetram (2002), Khushi (2003) and got the female lead role in the 2006 Malayalam film Pulijanmam, which was awarded the National Film Award for Best Feature Film in 2007.

Menon then moved to the "small screen", hosting TV shows and acting in serials, which include "Sriman Srimathi" and "Stree Hrudayam", before accepting film offers again. In 2009, she appeared in the Malayalam films, Bharya Onnu Makkal Moonnu, and Rahasya Police. She also acted in the Tamil film Eeram, produced by popular Tamil director S. Shankar. She hosted a popular family reality show in Malayalam named,"Sriman Srimathi".

Personal life
Sindhu Menon married Prabhu, a  Tamil Nadu information technology professional on 25 April 2003. The couple have a daughter and two sons.

Filmography

TV Serial
 Vamsam - Malayalam
 Karthika - Malayalam

References

External links
 

Indian film actresses
Living people
Actresses from Bangalore
Actresses in Tamil cinema
Actresses in Kannada cinema
Actresses in Malayalam cinema
Actresses in Telugu cinema
21st-century Indian actresses
Child actresses in Kannada cinema
20th-century Indian actresses
Indian child actresses
Actresses from Thrissur
Actresses in Malayalam television
Year of birth missing (living people)